Pieter de Hooch (also spelled "Hoogh" or "Hooghe"; 20 December 1629 (baptized) – 24 March 1684 (buried)) was a Dutch Golden Age painter famous for his genre works of quiet domestic scenes with an open doorway.  He was a contemporary, in the Delft Guild of St. Luke, of Jan Vermeer with whom his work shares themes and style.

Biography

De Hooch was born in Rotterdam to Hendrick Hendricksz de Hooch, a bricklayer, and Annetge Pieters, a midwife. He was the eldest of five children and outlived all of his siblings. Little is known of his early life and most archival evidence suggests he worked in Rotterdam, Delft, and Amsterdam. According to his first biographer Arnold Houbraken, he studied art in Haarlem under the landscape painter Nicolaes Berchem at the same time as Jacob Ochtervelt and was known for his "kamergezichten" or "room-views" with ladies and gentlemen in conversation. But De Hooch's work seems to continue in the spirit of Hendrik Sorgh, an older Rotterdam painter who had a special affinity for organizing figures in interiors. Beginning in 1650, he worked as a painter and servant for a linen-merchant and art collector named Justus de la Grange in Rotterdam. His service for the merchant required him to accompany him on his travels to The Hague, Leiden, and Delft, to which he moved in 1652. It is likely that de Hooch handed over most of his works to la Grange during this period in exchange for board and other benefits, as this was a common commercial arrangement for painters at the time, and a later inventory recorded that la Grange possessed eleven of his paintings.

De Hooch was married in Delft in 1654 to Jannetje van der Burch, by whom he fathered seven children. While in Delft, de Hooch is also believed to have learned from the painters Carel Fabritius and Nicolaes Maes, who were early members of the Delft School. He became a member of the painters' guild of Saint Luke in 1655 (two years after Vermeer). His daughter Anna was born in Delft on 14 November 1656. Based on the fact that his wife attended a baptism in Amsterdam in 1660, it has been determined that he moved to Amsterdam by then, though the success of the trekschuit by then meant that a trip to Amsterdam could be made easily in a day.

Works 
The early work of de Hooch was mostly composed of scenes of soldiers and peasants in stables and taverns in the manner of Adriaen van Ostade, though he used these to develop great skill in light, color, and perspective rather than to explore an interest in the subject matter. 

After starting his family in the mid-1650s, he switched his focus to domestic scenes. These were possibly of his own family, though his works of well-to-do women breastfeeding and caring for children could also indicate that he had attended his mother on her rounds as a midwife. 

His work showed astute observation of the mundane details of everyday life while also functioning as well-ordered morality tales. These paintings often exhibited a sophisticated and delicate treatment of light similar to those of Vermeer, who lived in Delft at the same time as de Hooch. 

The themes and compositions are also very similar between De Hooch and Vermeer. 19th-century art historians had assumed that Vermeer had been influenced by de Hooch's work and indeed PDH demonstrated first early on a special interest in combining the figure with interior geometry (see Interior with a Mother and Child and a Servant c. 1656 and others). An x-ray of the Interior with a Woman Weighing a Gold Coin shows that De Hooch had tried another figure in the empty chair first so this points to his canvas being the more original model that Vermeer quoted.

De Hooch also shared themes and compositions with Emanuel de Witte, though De Witte soon devoted himself mainly to painting church interior scenes after moving to Amsterdam in 1651. De Witte seems more preoccupied with the rooms themselves, filling his paintings with objects, and De Hooch is more interested in people and their relationships to each other, leaving his rooms empty of any extra objects that don't support the scene.

In the 1660s, he began to paint for wealthier patrons in Amsterdam, and is known for merry company scenes and family portraits in opulent interiors with marble floors and high ceilings. 

During his time in Amsterdam, he continued to make his domestic scenes, but both the interiors and their occupants appear more opulent.

De Hooch also depicted courting couples playing skittles. The highest quality version can be seen at Waddesdon Manor.  It was produced shortly after de Hooch moved to Amsterdam and is a good example of his depictions of early country house gardens which replaced his earlier simple Delft courtyards. The theme of skittle playing relates to 'Garden of Love' and 'Game of Love' imagery found in both high art and popular print culture. The woman looking out at the viewer is the protagonist in this sport of Love.

Little is known of De Hooch's living arrangements in Amsterdam, though it has been established that he had contact with Emanuel de Witte. In 1670, he was living in the Konijnenstraat. He lived in an area outside of the city walls but near the Westerkerk where his family attended church. Most scholars believe that de Hooch's work after around 1670 became more stylized and deteriorated in quality. It may be that his work was affected by his distress at the death of his wife in 1667 at age 38, leaving him with a young family. After 1680, de Hooch's painting style became coarser and darker in color. It's said often that he died in an asylum in 1684, but it was his son of the same name who died. The date of his death is unknown. In 2017 the Turing Foundation sponsored a new research project for the Delft Prinsenhof museum and the Rijksmuseum to work on a new overview exhibition focussing on the works in their collection, to be presented in a combined exhibition 2019–2020.

List of paintings

For a more complete list of paintings attributed to de Hooch, see the list of paintings by Pieter de Hooch:

 Arrière-cour d'une maison hollandaise – 1650–75. Louvre, Paris
 The Asparagus Vendor – 1675–80 (canvas). Minneapolis Institute of Arts, Minneapolis, Minnesota
 The Bedroom – c. 1658 – 1660 (canvas). National Gallery of Art, Washington, D.C.
 A Boy Bringing Bread – c. 1663 (canvas). The Wallace Collection, London
 Cardplayers in a Sunlit Room – 1658 (canvas). The Royal Collection, Windsor
 Card Players in an Opulent Interior (French: Joueurs de cartes dans un riche intérieur) – 1663–65 (canvas). Louvre, Paris
 Card Players at a Table – c. 1670 – 1674 (canvas)
 Children in a Doorway, with 'Colf' Sticks – c. 1658 – 1660 (panel)
 Couple in the Morning – 1665 (canvas)
 Couple with a Parrot – c. 1675 (canvas). Wallraf-Richartz Museum, Cologne
 A Couple with Musicians in a Hall – 1663–65 (canvas)
 Courtyard of a Dutch House – 1658 (oil)
 The Courtyard of a House in Delft – 1658 (canvas). National Gallery, London
 Courtyard with Lady and Serving Maid – c. 1660 – 1663 (canvas)
 Family Portrait on a Terrace – 1667 (canvas)
 Figures Drinking in a Courtyard – 1658 (canvas on panel)
 A Game of Ninepins – c. 1665 (oil). Waddesdon Manor, Buckinghamshire
 Garden Scene with Woman Holding a Glass of Wine, and a Child – c. 1658 – 1660
 Guardroom with Smiling Officer, Fluteplayer, and Soldiers – ???? (panel)
 Interior of a Dutch House – c. 1658 (oil)
Interior of the Burgomasters' Council Chamber in the Amsterdam Town Hall, with Visitors – c. 1663 – 1665 (canvas)
 Interior with a Mother and Child and a Servant c.1656 Private Collection New York
 Interior with a Young Couple – c. 1660–65 (canvas). Metropolitan Museum of Art, New York
 Interior with a Man Reading a Letter and a Woman Sewing – c. 1670 – 1674 (canvas). Kremer Collection
 A Man Offering a Woman a Glass of Wine – c.1650–55 (panel)
 A Man Reading a Letter to Woman – c. 1670 – 1674 (canvas)
 A Man with Dead Birds, and Other Figures, in a Stable – c. 1655 (oil on oak). National Gallery, London
 Merry Company – c. 1663 – 1665 (canvas)
 Merry Company with a Man and Two Women – c. 1668 – 1670 (canvas)
 A Merry Company with Two Men and Two Women – c. 1657 – 1658 (panel)
 The Merry Drinker – c. 1650 (panel)
 The Minuet – ???? (canvas)
 Mother and Child with a Serving Woman Sweeping – c. 1655 – 1657 (panel)
 Mother and Child with a Serving Woman Sweeping – ???? (canvas)
 A Mother's Duty – c. 1658–60 (canvas)
 Mother and Child with Schoolboy Descending a Stair – 1668
 Mother and Infant with Maidservant and a Child – c. 1663 – 1665 (canvas)
 Music Party in a Hall, A – c. 1663 – 1665 (canvas)
 A Musical Party in a Courtyard – 1677 (oil on canvas). National Gallery, London
 Musical Party on a Terrace, with the Town Hall – c. 1667 (canvas)
 Musical Party, A – 1674 (canvas)
 An Officer and a Woman Conversing, Soldier at the Window – c. 1663 – 1665 (canvas)
 A Party of Figures Around a Table – c.1663–65 (canvas)
 Paying the Hostess – mid-1670s (canvas). Metropolitan Museum of Art, New York
 Portrait of a Family in a Courtyard in Delft – 1657–60 (oil on canvas)
 Portrait of a Family Making Music – 1663 (canvas)
 Portrait of the Jacott-Hoppesack Family – c. 1670 (canvas)
 Saint Peter Liberated from Prison – c. 1650–55 (panel)
 Seated Couple with a Standing Woman in a Garden, A – c. 1663 – 1665 (canvas)
 Seated Soldier with a Standing Serving Woman, A – c. 1652 – 1655 (panel)
 Soldier with an Empty Glass and a Serving Woman, A – c. 1650 – 1655 (panel)
 Soldier, Woman, and Messenger – c. 1654 – 1657
 Soldiers and Serving Woman with Card Players – c. 1665 (oil on canvas)
 Soldiers Playing Cards – 1657–58 (panel)
 Soldiers with a Flute Player and a Serving Woman – ???? (panel)
 Sportsman and a Lady, A – 1684 (canvas)
 Standing Woman Holding an Infant, with a Woman Beside a Candle – ???? (canvas)
 The Maidservant formerly known as Gentleman and Lady in a Bedroom – c. 1667 – 1670 (oil on panel)
 Trac-Trac Players – c. 1652 – 1655 (oil on panel)
 Two Couples Embracing – c. 1673 – 1675 (canvas)
 Two Soldiers and a Serving Woman with Trumpeter – c. 1650 – 1655 (panel)
 Two Soldiers and a Woman Drinking in a Courtyard – c. 1658 – 1660 (canvas)
 Two Women and a Child in a Courtyard – c. 1657 – 1658 (oil on panel)
 Two Women and a Man Making Music – 1667
 Two Women Beside a Linen Chest, with a Child – 1663 (canvas)
 Two Women in a Courtyard – c. 1657 – 1660 (canvas)
 Woman and a Young Man with a Letter – 1670 (canvas). Rijksmuseum, Amsterdam
 Woman and Child in a Bleaching Ground, A – c. 1657 – 1659 (canvas)
 A Woman with a Child in a Pantry – c. 1658 (canvas)
 Woman and Child with a Parrot – 1673
 A Musical Conversation – 1674. Honolulu Museum of Art
 A Woman and her Maid in a Courtyard – c. 1660 – 1661 (canvas). National Gallery, London
 Woman Carrying a Bucket and Broom in a Courtyard – ???? (canvas)
 Woman Drinking with Soldiers (French: La Buveuse) – 1658. Louvre, Paris
 A Woman Drinking with Two Men, and a Maidservant – 1658 (oil on canvas). National Gallery, London
 Woman Feeding a Parrot, with a Man and Serving Woman – ???? (canvas)
 Woman Lacing Her Bodice Beside a Cradle – c. 1661 – 1663 (canvas)
 Woman Nursing an Infant, with a Child and a Dog – c. 1658 – 1660 (canvas), in San Francisco
 A Woman Peeling Apples, with a Small Child – c. 1663 (canvas). Wallace Collection, London
 A Woman Preparing Bread and Butter for a Boy – c. 1660 – 1663, in the Getty Center, Los Angeles
 Woman Preparing Vegetables – ???? (panel)
 Woman Reading a Letter by a Window – 1664 (canvas). Museum of Fine Arts, Budapest
 Woman Reading a Letter, and a Man at a Window, A – c. 1668 – 1670 (canvas on panel)
 Woman Reading, with a Child, A – c. 1660 – 1663 (canvas)
 Woman Receiving a Letter from a Man, A – c. 1668 – 1670 (canvas on panel)
 Woman with a Baby in Her Lap, and a Small Child, A – 1658 (panel)
 A Woman with a Basket of Beans in a Garden – c. 1651 (canvas)
 Woman with a Lute and a Man with a Flute, A – ???? (canvas)
 Woman Weighing Coins – c. 1664 (canvas). Kaiser Friedrich Museum-Verein, Berlin
 Wounded Man – c. 1667 (canvas)

References

Sources
 Pieter de Hooch:Complete Edition, by Peter C. Sutton, Phaidon Press, Oxford, 1980, 
 Encyclopædia Britannica
 "New information on Pieter de Hooch and the Amsterdam lunatic asylum", by Frans Grijzenhout, Burlington Magazine, September 2008

External links

A Game of Ninepins at Waddesdon Manor
From Dou to De Hooch blog article, Waddesdon Manor
"Pieter de Hooch online"
Works and literature on Pieter de Hooch
Vermeer and The Delft School, exhibition catalog from The Metropolitan Museum of Art (fully available online as PDF)
The Milkmaid by Johannes Vermeer, exhibition catalog from The Metropolitan Museum of Art (fully available online as PDF)
Fifteenth- to eighteenth-century European paintings: France, Central Europe, the Netherlands, Spain, and Great Britain, collection catalog from The Metropolitan Museum of Art (fully available online as a PDF)

Dutch Golden Age painters
Dutch male painters
Dutch genre painters
Painters from Rotterdam
1629 births
1684 deaths
Painters from Delft
Waddesdon Manor